Ron Birch (born 16 October 1943) is  a former Australian rules footballer who played with Footscray in the Victorian Football League (VFL).

Notes

External links 		
		
		
		
		
		
		
Living people		
1943 births		
		
Australian rules footballers from New South Wales		
Western Bulldogs players